Judge McRae may refer to:

Robert Malcolm McRae Jr. (1921–2004), judge of the United States District Court for the Western District of Tennessee
William McRae (1909–1973), judge of the United States District Courts for the Middle and Southern Districts of Florida

See also
Justice McRae (disambiguation)